The following is a list of transfers for the teams of the USL Pro league, the third level of the United States soccer pyramid, for the 2013 season. The transactions begin at the conclusion of the 2012 USL Pro season and end after the championship match of the 2013 season. The first signing of the season was former Aberdeen FC striker Darren Mackie who joined expansion side Phoenix FC. New players who are listed on a club's official roster but no official announcement was made appear at the end of the list.

Transfers

References

External links 
 https://web.archive.org/web/20110515060628/http://uslpro.uslsoccer.com/

USL Pro
USL Pro
Transfers
2013